The .204 Ruger is a centerfire rifle cartridge developed by Hornady and Ruger.  At the time of its introduction in 2004, the .204 Ruger was the second-highest velocity commercially produced ammunition and the only centerfire cartridge produced commercially for bullets of .204 inch/5 mm caliber.

Characteristics
The .204 Ruger was developed from the .222 Remington Magnum, which has the second-largest case capacity in the family that began with the .222 Remington.  Only the European 5.6×50mm Magnum is larger, which itself is a lengthened version of the .222 Remington Magnum. The .222 Remington Magnum provides about 5% more usable (below the neck) case capacity than the most popular member of the family, the NATO 5.56×45mm (.223 Remington). To make the .204 Ruger, the .222 Remington Magnum case was necked down to .204 inches (5 mm) and its shoulder moved forward and angle increased to 30 degrees. Bullets available in .204 caliber range from 24 to 55 grains (1.55  to 3.56 g). The Hornady factory load is listed at 4,225 ft/s (1288 m/s) with a  bullet. To achieve these velocities, the factory uses a proprietary powder composition known internally as SMP746, specially formulated by Primex, and, as of 2013, not 
available to handloaders. The propellant features a de-coppering agent that helps prevent fouling. Reloading data from Hornady, using commercially available powders, indicate velocity peaking at just under  with the  bullet in longer barrels. Many AR-15 rifle manufacturers now offer the .204 Ruger as an alternative chambering alongside the usual 5.56×45mm/.223 Rem.

Development

The .204 Ruger was the second Ruger-named cartridge produced by a partnership between Ruger and Hornady, the first being the big bore .480 Ruger revolver cartridge introduced in 2003 for the Super Redhawk.  With the backing of a major gunmaker and a major ammunition company, the round was an instant success, with other ammunition makers and firearms makers quickly adding the new chambering.  Ruger's initial offerings included the bolt action Model 77 MKII, and the single shot Ruger No. 1, and Hornady offered loadings with  bullets.

The first cartridge in the family, the .222 Remington, was a top benchrest shooting cartridge for many years after its introduction.

The .204 Ruger was intended primarily for varmint rifles, which require bullets with flat trajectories but not much mass or kinetic energy. The .204 was "splitting the difference" between the popular .224 varmint rounds such as the .220 Swift and .22-250 Remington, and the tiny .172 caliber rounds such as the .17 Remington and the .17 HMR.

Velocity
Ruger's claim to being the velocity king with the .204 was based on two points.

First, no other high-performance .20 caliber cartridge was commercially produced.  Second, the ammunition used to achieve the 4,225 ft/s was available only from Hornady using a special powder not available to the general public.

Handloaders typically achieve velocities more in the area of  using a  bullet.
Handloads using  bullets in other commercial cartridges such as the .22-250 Remington also achieve velocities similar to those of the .204 Ruger. The advantage of the .204 Ruger is that it achieves these velocities with less powder, less recoil, and less heat than the larger cartridges.
Hornady now offers a 24-grain lead free cartridge that claims 4,400 ft/s from a 26-inch barrel.
However, Hornady's 35 gr NTX .22-250 claims 4,450 ft/s from a 24-inch barrel.

See also
 5mm/35 SMc
 List of rifle cartridges
 Table of handgun and rifle cartridges

References

Further reading
 Cartridge Dimensions from 6mmBR.com
 Guns Magazine, 2004 
 GunBlast.com, May 2004

External links
 .204 Ruger info at Hornady website
 Sturm, Ruger & Co., Inc.
Ballistics Chart By Hornady

Sturm, Ruger & Company
Pistol and rifle cartridges
Weapons and ammunition introduced in 2004